Live at the BBC is a 1994 compilation album featuring performances by the Beatles that were originally broadcast on various BBC Light Programme radio shows from 1963 to 1965. The mono album, available in multiple formats but most commonly as a two-CD set, consists of 56 songs and 13 tracks of dialogue; 30 of the songs had never been issued previously by the Beatles. It was the first official release by the Beatles of previously unreleased performances since The Beatles at the Hollywood Bowl in 1977 and the first containing previously unreleased songs since their final studio album, Let It Be, in 1970.

Although the songs were recorded ahead of broadcast, allowing for retakes and occasional overdubbing, they are essentially "live in studio" performances. Most of the songs are cover versions of material from the late 1950s and early 1960s, reflecting the stage set they developed before Beatlemania. Before the album's release, comprehensive collections of the Beatles' BBC performances had become available on bootlegs.

A remastered repackaging of the album was released on 11 November 2013 on the occasion of the release of On Air – Live at the BBC Volume 2, a second volume of BBC Radio broadcasts. The two volumes were also released as a double set.

History

Recording
The Beatles performed for 52 BBC Radio programmes, beginning with an appearance on the series Teenager's Turn—Here We Go, recorded on 7 March 1962, and ending with the special The Beatles Invite You to Take a Ticket to Ride, recorded on 26 May 1965. 47 of their BBC appearances occurred in 1963 and 1964, including 10 on Saturday Club and 15 on their own weekly series Pop Go the Beatles, which began in June 1963. As the Beatles had not accumulated many original songs by this time, the majority of their BBC performances consisted of cover versions, drawing on the repertoire that they had developed for their early stage act. In total, 275 performances of 88 different songs were broadcast, of which 36 songs never appeared on their studio albums.

Several of the programmes aired live, but most were recorded days (or occasionally weeks) ahead of the broadcast date. The BBC's studio facilities were not as advanced as those at Abbey Road, offering only monaural recording (no multitracking) and basic overdubbing; few retakes of songs could be attempted owing to time limitations. It was not the BBC's practice to archive either the session tapes or the shows' master tapes, owing to storage space and contractual restrictions.

Earlier collections and presentations
The first collection of Beatles BBC performances was the bootleg album Yellow Matter Custard, issued in 1971, consisting of 14 songs that were probably off-air home recordings made during the original radio broadcasts. Some additional performances with similar "tinny" sound appeared on other bootlegs in the following years; then in 1980, the bootleg The Beatles Broadcasts was released featuring 18 BBC songs with superior sound quality.

To commemorate the 20th anniversary of their first BBC appearance, the BBC (nicknamed "the Beeb") aired the two-hour radio special "The Beatles at the Beeb" in 1982, featuring a mix of BBC performances and interviews (the show was expanded to three hours when syndicated to other countries). The more comprehensive series The Beeb's Lost Beatles Tapes was broadcast by BBC Radio 1 in 1988 as 14 half-hour episodes. When gathering material for that series, only a small number of original tapes were found; many more performances were obtained from vinyl recordings of the programmes that the BBC Transcription Department had made to distribute to BBC stations around the world.

By that time, a 13-album bootleg series had appeared under the title The Beatles at the Beeb, featuring many previously unavailable performances. This was surpassed in 1993 by The Complete BBC Sessions, a nine-CD box set released by Great Dane in Italy, where copyright protection for the broadcasts had expired; the set contained performances from 44 of the Beatles' 52 BBC appearances, including many complete shows.

Compilation and release
An official Beatles BBC album was being planned as early as 1982, and it was reported that "EMI was preparing an album" of the BBC material by late 1991. To supplement the archive he had partially rebuilt for The Beeb's Lost Beatles Tapes, BBC Radio producer Kevin Howlett sought out additional sources, such as tapes kept by people involved in the original sessions; others had contacted him after the series aired to inform him of their own home recordings of additional broadcasts. Remaining gaps were filled by recordings taken from available bootlegs.

From the available recordings, the tracks for Live at the BBC were selected by longtime Beatles producer George Martin. Martin's selection criteria included both the quality of the sound and of the Beatles' performance. Of particular interest were the 36 songs that the Beatles never performed on their official releases, of which 30 were selected for the album. Three of the six omitted were from 1962 (none of the 1962 recordings were judged to be of commercial sound quality): Roy Orbison's "Dream Baby (How Long Must I Dream)", the Coasters' arrangement of "Bésame Mucho" and Joe Brown's "A Picture of You", all with Pete Best on drums. Two others, from early 1963, also were omitted for substandard sound: the Gerry Goffin–Jack Keller adaptation of Stephen Foster's "Beautiful Dreamer" and Chuck Berry's "I'm Talking About You". The reason for the omission of the final song of the six, Carl Perkins' "Lend Me Your Comb" from July 1963, was not clear as it had very good sound quality, and it was speculated that it was held back for inclusion on a later release; the song was indeed issued the following year on Anthology 1. It was also later included on 2013's On Air – Live at the BBC Volume 2, as are "Beautiful Dreamer" and "I'm Talking About You".

The selected songs included "I'll Be on My Way", the only Lennon–McCartney composition that the Beatles recorded for the BBC with no available studio version. The Buddy Holly–style ballad was their first composition to be "given away" without the Beatles attempting to record it for their own release. The song was given to Billy J. Kramer, another artist managed by Brian Epstein recording for Parlophone, who released it in the United Kingdom as the B-side of a cover version of "Do You Want to Know a Secret".

In all, 56 songs were chosen for the album, along with some banter among the group and the hosts. Abbey Road engineer Peter Mew used audio manipulation software to reduce noise, repair minor drop-outs and equalise to a more consistent sound from one track to the next. The resulting sound quality was considered generally better than the best equivalent bootlegged versions available at the time, although a small number of tracks were noted as exceptions.

Live at the BBC was released on 30 November 1994 in the UK (Apple/Parlophone PCSP 726), and on 6 December 1994 in the United States (Apple/Capitol CDP 7243-8-31796-2-6). The track listing on the back of the CD case inadvertently included the word "Top" at the start of the song title "So How Come (No One Loves Me)"; the listing was corrected for the 2001 reissue. When "Baby It's You" was released as a single in March 1995, it contained three other BBC songs that were not included in the album, two of which would eventually be found on volume two.

2013 remaster
The 11 November 2013 remastered reissue features some minor changes in the track listing and editing. The original version of the album crossfaded the musical and speech tracks, whereas the remastered version does not, providing clean starts and endings for each track. The most noticeable change is the inclusion of three extra tracks. The only musical addition is the closing version of "From Us to You" at the end of disc two. "What is it, George?" is a new speech track between "Carol" and "Soldier of Love" on disc one. The speech track "Ringo? Yep!" replaces "Have a Banana!" as track three on disc two. The majority of "Have a Banana!" has been added to the end of the previous track, "A Hard Day's Night", but the phrase itself, which gave the original speech track its title, has been omitted.

Reception
Live at the BBC peaked at number 3 on the US Billboard 200 album chart and reached number 1 on the UK Albums Chart. The album sold an estimated 8 million copies worldwide during its first year of release.

A reviewer for Time said that the collection contained "few buried treasures", but "as a time capsule, the set is invaluable". Another reviewer described it as "worth hearing" even though the album is a "quaint memento" in which The Beatles sound "scruffy and fairly tame". Anthony DeCurtis, writing for Rolling Stone, was more enthusiastic, calling the album "an exhilarating portrait of a band in the process of shaping its own voice and vision" while noting the "irresistible" spirit and energy of the performances.

The album would go on to receive a Grammy nomination for Best Historical Album.

Track listing
Speech tracks are in italics.

1994 version

2013 version

Source programmes
The show's title and original broadcast date for each track, with the recording date in parentheses:

Saturday Club, 26 January 1963 (22 January 1963)
Disc 1
"Keep Your Hands off My Baby"
Pop Go the Beatles (2), 11 June 1963 (1 June 1963)
Disc 1
"Young Blood"
"Sha La La La La!"
"Baby It's You"
Disc 2
"Love These Goon Shows!"
"I Got to Find My Baby"
Pop Go the Beatles (3), 18 June 1963 (1 June 1963)
Disc 1
"Sure to Fall (In Love with You)"
Easy Beat, 23 June 1963 (19 June 1963)
Disc 1
"Some Other Guy"
"Thank You Girl"
Side by Side, 24 June 1963 (4 April 1963)
Disc 1
"I'll Be on My Way"
Pop Go the Beatles (5), 16 July 1963 (2 July 1963)
Disc 1
"That's All Right (Mama)"
"Carol"
"What Is It, George?"
"Soldier of Love"
"A Little Rhyme"
"Clarabella"
Pop Go the Beatles (6), 23 July 1963 (10 July 1963)
Disc 1
"A Taste of Honey"
Disc 2
"Sweet Little Sixteen"
"1822!"
"Lonesome Tears in My Eyes"
"Nothin' Shakin' (But the Leaves on the Trees)"
"So How Come (No One Loves Me)"
"Love Me Do"
Pop Go the Beatles (7), 30 July 1963 (10 July 1963)
Disc 1
"Memphis, Tennessee"
Disc 2
"The Hippy Hippy Shake"
"Set Fire to That Lot!"
"Matchbox"

Pop Go the Beatles (8), 6 August 1963 (16 July 1963)
Disc 1
"I'm Gonna Sit Right Down and Cry (Over You)"
"Crying, Waiting, Hoping"
"To Know Her Is to Love Her"
"The Honeymoon Song"
Disc 2
"Kansas City / Hey-Hey-Hey-Hey!"
Pop Go the Beatles (9), 13 August 1963 (16 July 1963)
Disc 1
"I Got a Woman"
"Long Tall Sally"
Pop Go the Beatles (10), 20 August 1963 (16 July 1963)
Disc 2
"Glad All Over"
"I Just Don't Understand"
"Slow Down"
Saturday Club, 24 August 1963 (30 July 1963)
Disc 1
"Dear Wack!"
"You Really Got a Hold on Me"
Pop Go the Beatles (11), 27 August 1963 (1 August 1963)
Disc 1
"A Shot of Rhythm and Blues"
Disc 2
"Ooh! My Soul"
"Ooh! My Arms"
"Don't Ever Change"
Pop Go the Beatles (12), 3 September 1963 (1 August 1963)
Disc 2
"Honey Don't"
Pop Go the Beatles (13), 10 September 1963 (3 September 1963)
Disc 1
"Too Much Monkey Business"
Saturday Club, 5 October 1963 (7 September 1963)
Disc 1
"Lucille"
Easy Beat, 20 October 1963 (16 October 1963)
Disc 1
"I Saw Her Standing There"

The Public Ear, 3 November 1963 (9 October 1963)
Disc 1
"Beatles Greetings"
Saturday Club, 15 February 1964 (7 January 1964)
Disc 1
"Johnny B Goode"
From Us to You (2), 30 March 1964 (28 February 1964)
Disc 1
"From Us to You" (Opening)
"Can't Buy Me Love"
"From Fluff to You"
"Till There Was You"
Disc 2
"Ringo? Yep!"
"I Wanna Be Your Man"
"Just a Rumour"
"Roll Over Beethoven"
"All My Loving"
"From Us to You" (Closing)
From Us to You (3), 18 May 1964 (1 May 1964)
Disc 2
"I Forgot to Remember to Forget"
Top Gear, 16 July 1964 (14 July 1964)
Disc 2
"Crinsk Dee Night"
"A Hard Day's Night"
"Have a Banana!"
"Things We Said Today"
Top Gear, 26 November 1964 (17 November 1964)
Disc 1
"Riding on a Bus"
Disc 2
"She's a Woman"
"I Feel Fine"
"I'm a Loser"
Saturday Club, 26 December 1964 (25 November 1964)
Disc 2
"Everybody's Trying to Be My Baby"
"Rock and Roll Music"
The Beatles Invite You to Take a Ticket to Ride, 7 June 1965 (26 May 1965)
Disc 2
"Ticket to Ride"
"Dizzy Miss Lizzy"

Personnel
John Lennon – vocals, rhythm guitar, lead guitar, harmonica, organ
Paul McCartney – vocals, bass guitar, electric piano
George Harrison – lead guitar, rhythm guitar, vocals
Ringo Starr – drums, vocals

Charts

Weekly charts

Year-end charts

Certifications and sales

Notes

References

1994 compilation albums
1994 live albums
Albums arranged by George Martin
Albums produced by George Martin
Apple Records compilation albums
Apple Records live albums
BBC Radio recordings
Compilation albums published posthumously
Live albums published posthumously
Radio programmes about the Beatles
The Beatles compilation albums
The Beatles live albums
BBC Light Programme programmes